Bescar Lane railway station is on the Manchester to Southport Line,  east of Southport in the village of Scarisbrick. Bescar Lane is an old cottage-style station, operated by Northern Trains. Its remote location, some distance from the centre of Scarisbrick Parish, is considered "problematical".

History 
Bescar Lane station was built by the Manchester and Southport Railway and opened on 9 April 1855, and from January 1885 was part of the Lancashire and Yorkshire Railway (L&YR). The L&YR amalgamated with the London and North Western Railway on 1 January 1922 and in turn was grouped into the London, Midland and Scottish Railway (LMS) in 1923. Nationalisation followed in 1948. Part of the line running from Bescar Lane directly to Southport through  and  closed in 1965, in order to enable the closure of the level crossing on a busy road at Blowick, causing trains to divert through  on a section of the old Liverpool, Southport and Preston Junction Railway. When Sectorisation was introduced in the 1980s, the station was served by Regional Railways until the privatisation of British Rail.

The station's level crossing was controlled by a signal box until the early 1990s, but this was closed and demolished after automatic barriers were installed and the fixed signals removed.  The platform layout has also been altered, with the westbound platform moved to the opposite side of the crossing - previously both platforms were sited on the eastern side (the redundant one can still be seen).

Facilities
The station is unmanned and has no ticket machine, so all tickets must be purchased in advance or on the train. There are shelters on each platform, but no other permanent buildings.  Train running information can be obtained from timetable posters or by telephone.  Step-free access is available to both platforms.

Services 

Monday to Saturdays there is generally a two-hourly service to Southport westbound and Manchester Victoria via  and  eastbound.

The last service to Southport is at 21:29 and the last service towards Wigan Wallgate and Manchester stations is at 22:28.   There is no Sunday service, though a normal service operates on most Bank Holidays.

References

External links 

Bescar Lane Station Information at Northern Railway.

Railway stations in the Borough of West Lancashire
DfT Category F2 stations
Former Lancashire and Yorkshire Railway stations
Railway stations in Great Britain opened in 1855
Northern franchise railway stations